Lider TV was a private television channel in Azerbaijan. It was founded on 1 September 2000 by Media Ltd. Lider TV declared bankruptcy on 16 June 2020, later defunct since 1 June 2021.

References

External links
lidertv.com, official website 

Television stations in Azerbaijan
Television networks in Azerbaijan
Azerbaijani-language television stations
Television channels and stations established in 2000
2000 establishments in Azerbaijan